Kata Pejnović (21 March 1899 – 1966) was a Croatian Serb feminist and politician.

Life
Kata Pejnović was born on 21 March 1899 in the village of Smiljan in the Kingdom of Croatia-Slavonia, then part of the Austro-Hungarian Empire to a poor Serbian family. She completed her only formal education, elementary school, in 1911, before starting work to help feed her family. 

Kata Pejnović became politically active in the local Communist movement from 1936 and was accepted into the Communist Party of Yugoslavia on 10 April 1938. Following the formation of the anti-communist Independent State of Croatia after the Axis invasion of Yugoslavia in April 1941, the Croatian fascists killed her husband and three sons in July. Bedridden from 1963, she died three years later.

Activities
In the communist party, Pejnović focused on reducing ethnic tensions between Serbs and Croats and women's issues. To help spread anti-fascist propaganda among the women of Croatia, she
helped to found the first women's newspaper, Woman in Struggle (Žena u borbi), in partisan-controlled Croatia in March 1942. Later that year, she was the only woman delegate to the Anti-Fascist Council for the National Liberation of Yugoslavia in November and Pejnović was elected President of the Antifascist Women's Front (Antifašistički front žena) shortly afterwards. She was elected to the Central Committee of the Communist Party of Croatia in 1948 and repeatedly served in the Parliament of the People's Republic of Croatia and twice in the Federal Assembly.

Notes

References

1899 births
1966 deaths
People from Gospić
Serbs of Croatia
Austro-Hungarian Serbs
Habsburg Serbs
Croatian feminists
Croatian politicians
Croatian women's rights activists
20th-century Croatian women politicians
20th-century Croatian politicians
Socialist feminists
Recipients of the Order of the People's Hero
Burials at Mirogoj Cemetery